Nuussuup Kangia (old spelling: Nûgssûp Kangia) is a fjord in northwestern Greenland, located at the northern end of Upernavik Archipelago.

Geography 

Cornell Glacier drains the Greenland ice sheet into the head of Nuussuup Kangia, to the east of the base of Nuussuaq Peninsula. The fjord is an inlet of Sugar Loaf Bay, flowing southwestward between Nuussuaq Peninsula in the northwest, and the Anoritooq nunatak on the mainland of Greenland in the east.

References 

Sugar Loaf Bay
Fjords of the Upernavik Archipelago